Julia Ratti (born 1969) is an American politician who served as a member of the Nevada Senate from 2016 to 2021. She represented the 13th district, which covers parts of Washoe County, including much of Sparks and Reno.

Early life and education
Ratti was born in Reno, Nevada. She earned a Bachelor of Arts degree in photography and journalism from the University of Nevada, Reno and a Master of Science in non-profit administration from the University of San Francisco in 2004.

Career 
In 2008, Ratti was elected to the Sparks City Council, and reelected in 2012. She decided not to run for reelection to the Council in 2016 in order to run for the Senate in a special election to replace Senator Debbie Smith, who had died.

In September 2016, Ratti was appointed to the Senate in order to replace Smith. She won election to the seat in November 2016.

During the 2017 legislative session, she served as chair of Senate Committee on Revenue and Economic Development and vice chair of the Senate Committee on Health and Human Resources.

Ratti resigned from the Senate on November 19, 2021.

Personal life
Ratti is married to James Cavanaugh.

Electoral history

References

1969 births
Living people
Nevada city council members
Democratic Party Nevada state senators
Politicians from Reno, Nevada
Politicians from Sparks, Nevada
University of Nevada, Reno alumni
University of San Francisco alumni
Women state legislators in Nevada
21st-century American politicians
21st-century American women politicians
Women city councillors in Nevada